Peter Turner (born 23 January 1974) is a former Australian rules footballer who played with Adelaide and Carlton in the Australian Football League (AFL).

Notes

External links

Peter Turner's profile at Blueseum

1974 births
Carlton Football Club players
Adelaide Football Club players
North Adelaide Football Club players
Australian rules footballers from South Australia
Living people